Milan Tučić (born 15 August 1996) is a Slovenian football player who plays for Hokkaido Consadole Sapporo.

Club career
Tučić played for the youth teams of Slovenian club Bravo. In 2015, he made his debut appearance for Bravo's first team, which was playing in the Slovenian Third League at the time. In the 2016–17 season, he scored 32 goals in 23 appearances, which made him the top goalscorer of the Third League's Centre Division, as his club won the league title and was promoted to the Slovenian Second League at the end of the season. In July 2017, he joined Slovenian PrvaLiga side Rudar Velenje. In his two years with Rudar, he scored 23 goals in 69 league appearances, and also played in the 2018–19 UEFA Europa League qualifying rounds, where he scored twice against Tre Fiori.

On 2 September 2019, he signed with Belgian club OH Leuven. Tučić made only four league appearances for Leuven until January 2021, when he was loaned out to his former club Bravo, which had been promoted to the Slovenian PrvaLiga by then. In the second part of the 2020–21 PrvaLiga season, he scored 10 goals in 18 league appearances.

In August 2021, Tučić signed for J1 League club Hokkaido Consadole Sapporo.

International career
From 2017 to 2018, Tučić made six appearances for the Slovenian under-21 team, and also scored two goals in the process.

References

External links
 Milan Tučić at NZS 
 

1996 births
Living people
Footballers from Ljubljana
Slovenian footballers
Association football forwards
NK Bravo players
NK Rudar Velenje players
Oud-Heverlee Leuven players
Hokkaido Consadole Sapporo players
Slovenian PrvaLiga players
Challenger Pro League players
Belgian Pro League players
J1 League players
Slovenian expatriate footballers
Expatriate footballers in Belgium
Expatriate footballers in Japan
Slovenian expatriate sportspeople in Belgium
Slovenian expatriate sportspeople in Japan
Slovenia under-21 international footballers